Cannibal is the fifth studio album by American heavy metal band Static-X, released on April 3, 2007. This is the first album from the band to contain guitar solos; every song with the exception of "Goat" has one. Cannibal was the first album to be produced by John Travis, and the first album to not feature Ulrich Wild, who produced and/or mixed the band's first four albums.

Album information
Cannibal is the first Static-X album since 1999's Wisconsin Death Trip to feature guitar playing from original guitarist Koichi Fukuda, who left the band in 2000 and rejoined in 2005. (Fukuda is credited as the guitarist on the 2005 album Start a War, but only contributed programming and additional guitars after Tripp Eisen's departure.)

Cannibal features an overall more straight forward heavy and aggressive sound when compared to the band's two previous albums. The last two previous albums Shadow Zone and Start a War had a more radio friendly sound featuring much cleaner vocals and a slight toning down of the industrial metal elements. It features more screaming from frontman Wayne Static. The album's sound is very similar to the sound featured on the band's first two albums, Wisconsin Death Trip and Machine, and the more radio-friendly sound the band had used on the albums Shadow Zone and Start a War is largely absent. The album is often regarded by fans as the band's heaviest album along with the band's second album Machine. This album is also the first Static-X album to be released through Reprise Records.

When asked about the album, Wayne Static said:

The first song released from the album was "Cannibal". However, the song "Destroyer" was released as the first single to radio, and a music video was made to accompany it.

The track "No Submission" is additionally available on the Saw III soundtrack. The title song "Cannibal" was released to iTunes on February 5 as a digital download single. "Destroyer" appeared later, on February 13 and appeared as an EP by March 20. The music video for "Destroyer" premiered on the internet on April 6.

While the title song "Cannibal" was inspired by Wayne's vegetarian thoughts of people eating meat, "Reptile" is simply about being eaten alive by a huge reptile. On January 18, 2007, a MySpace bulletin from the band revealed the track listing.

Reception
The album debuted at #36 on the U.S. Billboard 200 with sales of about 30,000. and 98,000 by June of the same year.

Versions
The album is available in the standard 12-track edition (both clean and explicit), special internet edition with the bonus track "Get Up and Boogie", Best Buy edition with two bonus tracks ("Light It Up" and a remix of "I'm the One") and was briefly offered in limited supply with a booklet signed by members of the band. When downloading the album from the iTunes Store, another bonus track is included called "Beneath, Between, Beyond", which is also the title of band's only compilation album, even though the song was written two plus years after the album was released. This was also the first Static-X album to be released on vinyl. Spotify only carries the clean version of this album.

Track listing

Personnel

Static-X
 Wayne Static – lead vocals, rhythm guitar
 Koichi Fukuda – lead guitar, keyboards; programming
 Tony Campos – bass guitar, backing vocals
 Nick Oshiro – drums

Other personnel
 Wayne Static – production
 John 5 – first guitar solo on "Cannibal"
 John Travis – production and mixing
 Tom Baker – mastering
 Steven Gilmore – art direction, design, digital imagery
 Dean Karr – photography
 Eric Fincher – guitar/bass technician
 Johnny B – drum tech/monitor engineering

Assisting engineering
 Jason Gitlitz 
 Assen Stoyanov

Chart positions

Album

Singles

References

2007 albums
Static-X albums
Reprise Records albums